Speicher is a surname. Notable people with the surname include:

Clifton T. Speicher (1931–1952), United States Army soldier and Medal of Honor recipient
Eugene Speicher (1883–1962), American artist
Georges Speicher (1907–1978), French cyclist
Scott Speicher, American pilot